Ho Chi Minh City College of Stage Performance and Cinematics is a college in District 1, Ho Chi Minh City, Vietnam. The college provides college degree courses (3-3.5 years) in stage performance, cinematics. Most of the actors and actresses in Ho Chi Minh graduated from this college.

Colleges in Ho Chi Minh City